Scrobipalpa candicans is a moth in the family Gelechiidae. It was described by Povolný in 1996. It is found in China (Xinjiang), Kyrgyzstan and south-eastern Kazakhstan.

References

Scrobipalpa
Moths described in 1996